In graph theory, the Kelmans–Seymour conjecture states that every 5-vertex-connected graph that is not planar contains a subdivision of the 5-vertex complete graph . It is named for Paul Seymour and Alexander Kelmans, who independently described the conjecture; Seymour in 1977 and Kelmans in 1979. A proof was announced in 2016, and published in four papers in 2020.

Formulation
A graph is 5-vertex-connected when there are no five vertices that removed leave a disconnected graph.
The complete graph is a graph with an edge between every five vertices, and a subdivision of a complete graph modifies this by replacing some of its edges by longer paths.

In any drawing of the graph on the Euclidean plane, at least two of the ten paths must cross each other, so a graph G that contains a K5 subdivision cannot be a planar graph. In the other direction, by Kuratowski's theorem, a graph that is not planar necessarily contains a subdivision of either  or of the complete bipartite graph .

Related results
One way of restating this result is that, in these graphs, it is always possible to perform a sequence of edge contraction operations so that the resulting graph contains a  subdivision. The Kelmans–Seymour conjecture states that, with a higher order of connectivity, these contractions are not required.

Because planar graphs have at most  edges, the graphs with at least  edges must be nonplanar. However, they need not be 5-connected, and 5-connected graphs can have as few as  edges.

Claimed proof
In 2016, a proof of the Kelmans–Seymour conjecture was claimed by Xingxing Yu of the Georgia Institute of Technology and his Ph.D. students Dawei He and Yan Wang. A sequence four papers proving this conjecture appeared in Journal of Combinatorial Theory, Series B.

See also 
 Four-color theorem
 Hajós' conjecture

References

Planar graphs
Graph minor theory